Rallicola is a genus of chewing louse. It is an ectoparasite of rails and other birds. It was named by Thomas Harvey Johnston and Launcelot Harrison in 1911. There are two subgenera aside from the nominotypical subgenus: Aptericola, whose species are found on kiwi birds, and Huiacola, a monospecific subgenus consisting of Rallicola extinctus, once found on the huia.

Taxonomic history
In 1866, Ferdinand Rudow circumscribed the Philopteridae genus Trabeculus with Trabeculus schillingi as its type species. In 1870, he created a new genus, Oncophorus with the same type species, making it an objective junior synonym of Trabeculus. In 1880, Édouard Piaget added more species to Oncophorus.

Thomas Harvey Johnston and Launcelot Harrison created a new genus name, Rallicola, in 1911. A new name was needed as Oncophorus  and Oncophorus  had a senior homonym and senior synonym, respectively. They only included Oncophorus  species that parasitized rails and jacanas, leaving those that parasitized owls and hornbills to other genera.

In 1915, Harrison split the genus into three subgenera: Rallicola (Rallicola) for species found on Rallidae (rails), Rallicola (Parricola) for those species found on Parridae, and Rallicola (Aptericola) for species found on Apterygidae (kiwis). Harrison's 1916 list of Mallophaga species recognized sixteen valid species in Rallicola, one in Parricola and three in Aptericola.

In 1990, Eberhard Mey described a new species, Huiacola extinctus and circumscribed a new genus, Huiacola for it. Huiacola was subsequently classified as a subgenus of Rallicola.

Type species
Johnston and Harrison designated "O. attenuatus " as its type species. This referred to a species Christian Ludwig Nitzsch named Philopterus (Nirmus) attenuatus, which Édouard Piaget included in his 1880 taxonomy of Oncophorus.

However, Nitzch's use of this name was nomen nudum as it was only accompanied with a queried indication to a previously-described taxon, namely Franz von Paula Schrank's 1781 description of Pediculus ortygometrae. The name only became available in 1838 as Nirmus , when Hermann Burmeister provided the same indication to Schrank but without marking it as questionable.

Synonyms
, six synonyms for this genus are recognized. Hopkins and Clay designated Oncophorus bisetosus  as the type species of Piaget's Oncophorus. Harrison listed the type species of his subgenus Parricola as  "Rallicola (Parricola) sulcata ", i.e., Oncophorus sulcatus .

Three of its junior synonyms were named and circumscribed by M. A. Carriker, Jr.
In a 1949 paper, he created the genus Epipicus for his new species E. scapanoides. In another paper published in 1949, he named the genus Corvicola, which consisted of his newly-described species C. insulana. By 1952, Hopkins and Clay had classified Furnaricola, Epipicus, and Corvicola as junior synonyms of Rallicola. In a 1966 paper, Carriker defended the validity of Furnaricola as a distinct genus.  and  treated Furnaricola as its own genus in 1987, but in 1993 Price and Dale Clayton concurred with Hopkins and Clay's synonymization.

In 1982,  circumscribed the genus Psophiicola. Its type species is Liperus foedus , which he transferred from Rallicola. This was the only species included in his circumscription.

Hosts
In 1953, Theresa Clay reported that Rallicola have been found on 47 species across 25 genera of Rallidae. Rallicola can also be found on birds in the Aramidae (limpkins), and Psophiidae (trumpeters) families. The sole Huiacola species R. (H.) extinctus was found on the extinct huia bird, in the family Callaeidae. Species in Aptericola are found on Apterygidae (kiwi birds).

Distribution
The subgenera Huiacola and Aptericola are both endemic to New Zealand. Species in the subgenus Rallicola can be found in North America, and New Zealand. An undescribed Rallicola (Rallicola) species was recorded in the Galápagos Islands in 2013.

Subgenera and species
Three subgenera are recognized, including the nominate subgenus.

Rallicola

Rallicola . Type species: Nirmus attenuatus . Approximately 90 species, including:

 Rallicola acutifrons 
 Rallicola advenus 
 Rallicola  
 Rallicola chunchotambo 
 Rallicola cuspidatus 
 Rallicola foedus 
 Rallicola funebris 
 Rallicola guami 
 Rallicola heterocephala 
 Rallicola insulana 
 Rallicola laticephala 
 Rallicola ortygometrae 
 Rallicola parvigenitalis 
 Rallicola piageti 
 Rallicola scapanoides 
 Rallicola titicacae 
 Rallicola zumpti

Aptericola
Aptericola . Type species: Rallicola (Aptericola) gadowi . Four species:

 Rallicola gadowi 
 Rallicola gracilentus 
 Rallicola pilgrimi 
 Rallicola rodericki

Huiacola
Huiacola . Type species:  Huiacola extinctus . One species:
 Rallicola extinctus

References

Works cited

Further reading

 
 

Lice
Insect genera
Parasites of birds